Brajesh Lal, born in 1963 in Varanasi, India, is an American of Indian origin, surgeon, and an expert in vascular disease, particularly the prevention and treatment of stroke and venous disease.

Career 

A graduate of the All India Institute of Medical Sciences, Brajesh is a tenured Professor of Vascular Surgery at the University of Maryland and Professor of Neurology at Mayo Clinic. He holds additional appointments at the Department of Bioengineering at University of Maryland and George Mason University. He founded and currently directs the multi-specialty Center for Vascular Research and the NIH Vascular Imaging Core Facility at the University of Maryland. He has been elected as a Distinguished Fellow of the Society for Vascular Surgery and Distinguished Fellow of the American Venous Forum.

Academic work 
Brajesh's contributions are focused on two major vascular illnesses that affect millions of patients every year and that are major causes of death and disability: carotid artery disease and venous disease.

Carotid disease and cognitive-mobility dysfunction 
His research on how progressive narrowing of the carotid artery reduced brain perfusion has led to the discovery of cognitive and mobility dysfunction as new, previously unsuspected morbidities resulting from carotid artery disease. These findings are leading to a shift on how this disease is viewed. Even without causing a stroke, the carotid disease leads to chronic disabilities that impact quality of life. Since carotid blockages affect 5 – 10% of all older adults, these newly discovered problems affect a very large and vulnerable group of people. He delivered the Clemens Lecture at Yale School of Medicine on this topic. He is now conducting clinical trials to test whether medications, exercise interventions, and surgical correction of the blockage can reverse these morbidities.

Carotid disease and stroke 
His research on carotid artery disease contributed to the introduction of minimally invasive carotid artery stenting as an alternative to surgery in selected patients at risk for developing a stroke. He has participated in writing the guidelines that are used for treating carotid artery disease in the US. He is now leading the world's largest randomized clinical trial to help determine whether blockages in the carotid artery are best treated with medications or with surgery. This trial is being conducted across 170 medical centers in the United States, Canada, Israel, Spain, and Australia.

He has recently introduced artificial intelligence algorithms to detect geometric and tissue characteristics of plaques building up within carotid arteries to identify patients with a high risk for future stroke. This research will also identify patients with a low risk for stroke who can be spared unnecessary surgery.

Venous disease 
His research on venous hemodynamics has led to the discovery that increasing venous blood flow through exercise interventions can accelerate thrombus resolution and prevent chronic post-thrombotic syndrome in patients with acute deep vein thrombosis (DVT). He is currently utilizing artificial intelligence methodologies to discover new risk factors for DVT using information from over 9 million hospitalized patients. This is one of the first applications of deep learning techniques in evaluating venous disease.

COVID-19 pandemic 
Through the ongoing COVID-19 pandemic, he has been evaluating the impact of disruptions in non-COVID-related healthcare services on long-term outcomes on non-COVID illnesses. The goal was to help design informed solutions for recovery period. This research has identified a large and unsuspected deficit in diagnoses of new cancers, which has raised concerns for a future epidemic of late-stage cancers in the coming years. The analytic approach used in these studies can now be replicated by any country, individual states within the US, free-standing healthcare systems, or other hospitals where databases are available. These investigations have informed the VA National Surgical Office and the results have already impacted their decision-making at a national level.

Other academic work and positions held 
Brajesh is past president of the American Venous Forum  (AVF). He a founding member of the South Asian American Society for Vascular Surgeons (SAAVS) and is a past president of the society. He was program director of the second oldest vascular fellowship training program in the United States at Rutgers University and has trained over 100 vascular surgeons. His research Center has been continuously funded by the National Institutes of Health (NIH) and the Veterans Affairs (VA) Research Department for the past 15 years, where he has trained over 100 vascular researchers. He has published over 400 manuscripts, abstracts, and book chapters. He currently serves on the executive board of the Eastern Vascular Society (EVS), and has chaired several Vascular Guidelines for the Society for Vascular Surgery. He is a fellow of the American College of Surgeons and has received the Faculty Research Award from the American College of Surgeons.

References

1963 births
Living people
University of Maryland School of Medicine faculty
People from Varanasi
Indian emigrants to the United States
American surgeons
Vascular surgeons
All India Institute of Medical Sciences, New Delhi alumni
Fellows of the American College of Surgeons